Christian Michelsen may refer to:

 Christian Michelsen, Norwegian shipping magnate and statesman
 Christian Michelsen (footballer), Norwegian footballer